The ITV television network in the United Kingdom began as a group of regional stations, each with their own identities. Each station used its own idents to create an individual identity.

In 1989, a first attempt to establish a national ITV corporate identity was made, which saw regional brands combined with a new national ITV brand. The attempt had only limited success: some companies never adopted the ITV branding, while many others later diluted or abandoned the ITV component as time progressed. A second attempt in 1998 was more successful, but was still rejected or significantly modified by some companies. 

In 2002, a major change of appearance occurred when all ITV regions in England adopted national continuity. Regional logos vanished and regional names were mentioned only before regional programmes. Effectively this left ITV1 in England looking like a national channel with slots for regional opt-outs – like BBC One – rather than a group of independent regional broadcasters sharing programmes. The unification was consolidated in 2004 when Granada plc acquired Carlton Communications to form ITV plc. By then, the two companies had acquired all the regional Channel 3 companies in England and Wales. ITV plc later acquired Channel Television in the Channel Islands and UTV in Northern Ireland.

This article looks at the history of presentation of the ITV brand on the main ITV network. The other digital channels owned by ITV plc also adopted logos very similar to the main ITV channel but with different colour schemes and background images; these are not covered by this article.

Before 1981
When ITV was incepted in 1955, every regional company had its own individual logo and identity for its own use and identification within the network. The name "ITV" was rarely used on air and had no associated broadcast logo.

From the mid-1970s to the mid-1980s, the IBA (Independent Broadcasting Authority) regulator used a matching pair of logos for ITV and ILR (Independent Local Radio), but these appear to have been used in print only.

1981
From 1981, a generic, 'blocky-looking' logo was used infrequently throughout the 1980s, often in a rainbow colouration for promos produced by the "Big Five" franchises (Thames Television, London Weekend Television, Granada Television, Yorkshire Television and ATV/Central Independent Television), as well as holding slides used by some of the regions and Channel 4 (for cross-promotion purposes), but it was never widely used as the centrepiece of an identity.

1989

A new generic ITV logo was introduced on 1 September 1989 and accompanied a first-time, national on-air identity designed by English Markell Pockett with music by Lord David Dundas. The logo was the centre of a whole branding package; there was a national logo and regional logos for all of the ITV franchises. Each franchise had a distinctive portion of their logo included into the V of the ITV logo. The ident was generally formed by beginning with the franchisee's logo, then going into a sliding sequence featuring an arctic tern, a couple in period dress, Big Ben, an athlete, and a pair of dancers before the regional ITV logo is reformed. Along with this, each franchise received a regional clock, trailer style, network font, and break bumpers.

However, their new look did not go as the designers intended:

 Anglia Television, Channel Television, TVS, TSW and Ulster Television did not adopt the look at all. The logo, however, appeared on network trailers, end boards (the company who made the programme or feature), and at the start of some networked programmes (such as Morning Worship).
 Granada Television used an altered version to suit their normal branding package. 
 Yorkshire Television's moving ident was altered on 7 January 1991 so that their 'chevron' logo appeared full in place of the triangle shape and zoomed into the centre of the screen at the end of the ident, a different font was also used.

Their look was dropped at various times depending on the region:
 Scottish Television used the ident sparingly in conjunction with its own, but then dropped it by the early part of 1990.
 Granada Television had dropped their altered ident look in 1991, being replaced with their own package.
 Thames Television ended the 1989 package entirely, a few weeks after losing their franchise in 1991. This included trailers, holding slides, and created their own ident and presentation package.
 Tyne Tees Television returned to their own new-look package around 1991, but kept their music in subsequent idents.
 LWT ended the package after 30 August 1992.
 HTV completely dropped their look and launched with their own presentation package on 1 January 1993.
 Central Television used the original version, but quickly decided to revise the ident with many variations linked to their branding. In September 1990 Central introduced a new presentation package, however, this still featured the ITV logo in some form on certain idents, but these were gradually phased out by 1993.
 Border Television stopped using the generic ident after 5 September 1993 but kept their music in their own subsequent idents.
 Yorkshire Television ended the package after 23 October 1994 and used their own versions.
 Grampian Television continued to use the 1989 generic ident right up until ITV's new corporate logo was introduced in October 1998. They had also been taken over by SMG at this point.

October 1998 – 2002

On 5 October 1998, the ITV logo was changed to a lower-cased blue and yellow affair. This was in line with the fact that with the uppercased ITV logo used previously, the viewer perception of ITV was a high-brow stuffy channel, it was not aimed at younger audiences. ITV changed the logo to reverse the younger audience's perceptions.

On 8 November 1999, the next generic look was launched, designed by English and Pockett with music by Lord David Dundas, both of whom were involved with the last look. The main theme of the look was the ITV slogan of 'TV from the heart'. There were three variations of the ident:

 An opening film that incorporated a heart shape at the end, before transferring to a spinning hearts background with the region name, with the ITV logo below it with their logo in a small box above the name.
 The name, logo, and ITV logo form from lines coming across from the sides of the screen over the spinning hearts background.
 The name, logo, and ITV logo are fully formed on a spinning hearts background.

The lines and static idents could also feature a spinning hearts background that was tinted brown that was used during Daytime schedules. The look was accompanied by a clock superimposed on a spinning hearts background, as well as promotions provided by ITV's Network Promotions Unit. A heartbreak bumper was also provided. Upon launch and over time, some changes were made to the look:

 On 11 August 2001, ITV changed its name to ITV1, and the logo was changed accordingly.
 Border Television did not use their logo with the look.
 HTV and LWT used their logo in place of their name on the end slides.
 In November 2001, an animated "itv.com" website logo was added to the bottom of the idents.
 By November 2001, most regions had discarded the live-action startups.
 To allow cross-channel promotions, the logos of ITV2 and the ITV Sport Channel could also be added to the idents.

As with the last look, not all of the companies adopted it:

 The companies owned by Granada Ltd and UNM, these being Granada Television, Tyne Tees Television, Yorkshire Television, LWT, Border Television, Meridian Broadcasting and Anglia Television all adopted the full look.
 Channel Television used the look thoroughly, creating a full rebrand out of the elements of the new look. Major changes included a new logo (featuring comets forming a heart around a spinning globe) and a new slogan ("The Heart of the Islands"). They used the Idents but with a completely different soundtrack and were the only region to use the clock ident.
 The Carlton Television owned regions of Carlton London, Westcountry Television and Central Independent Television all adopted the look besides the idents. Instead, on 6 September 1999, they launched their own take on the hearts instead of using the generic idents. The idents were designed by Lambie-Nairn. This look saw the end of the Westcountry Television and Central Independent Television brands. The idents featured an animation involving dynamic hearts that would end with a star flashing on the top-right corner of the heart to reveal the Carlton Television logo with a star next to it, the ITV logo underneath it, and the Carlton website at the bottom, on a rotating star background.
 HTV was originally owned by UNM and so adopted the Hearts look. However, when UNM was sold to Granada Television, to comply with competition laws, HTV had to be sold to Carlton Television. From July 2001 onwards, the idents were slightly changed to a strange mix of Heart and Star. The new idents would start out with one of the Carlton animations without the Star before flashing white. Following this, the heart-shaped flash zooms out to become the V of the HTV logo imposed on the blue spinning hearts background.
 UTV, Grampian Television, and Scottish Television did not adopt the look, instead to continue their own look. Both Grampian Television and Scottish Television later took a unified look featuring a blue square from 2000 until 2003.

Once again like the last look, it was dropped at different times:

 LWT dropped the look on 24 March 2000, replacing it with their own video wall idents until 2002. 
 The Granada Television, Tyne Tees Television, Yorkshire Television, LWT, Border Television, Meridian Broadcasting, Anglia Television, Carlton London, Westcountry Television and Central Independent Television regions all dropped the look on 28 October 2002 to be replaced by the celebrity idents until 2004.
 Channel Television dropped the heart idents on 28 October 2002, but retained the clock for a few more months, and retained the hearts logo and slogan until they were replaced alongside the January 2006 rebrand.

October 2002 – 2004

On Monday 28 October 2002, a new idents package was rolled out across the regions using the central theme of a celebrity posing 'backstage'. There would be a clip of the celebrity chilling out when they were supposedly off-screen. The 'ITV1' logo had been softened with smoother edges by this point and it would animate on in the bottom right-hand corner, being formed from 3 aligned blue blocks and one yellow block. This package also coincided with the centralisation of continuity from the English, Isle of Man, and Scottish Border regions to London. As a result of this, announcers were always from a national team of six live from the Carlton/LWT continuity booth, even with regional idents. Wales retained its own announcers for the time being.

The regional versions of the idents were now only used in Scotland, Wales, and Northern Ireland throughout the day. The other regions had their own idents specifically for use before local programmes. These varied subtly by region:

 Grampian Television and Scottish Television used the national idents replaced with their own two-toned blue oblong logo instead of the ITV1 logo. They adopted the look in 2003.
 UTV also used the main idents, but replaced the ITV1 logo with their own purple and yellow logo.
 The former HTV Wales region was renamed ITV1 Wales. They used the idents featuring a yellow oblong containing the word "WALES" under the ITV1 logo.
 Channel Television used their ident before local programmes only. Their ident featured local celebrities, while the left half of the screen displays the Channel heart logo on a navy blue background.
 The Anglia, Border, Granada, Meridian, Tyne Tees and Yorkshire Television regions all featured a celebrity while on the left-hand side of the screen against a light blue background, the franchise name is featured in yellow against a navy blue box that surrounds and includes the ITV1 logo
 The Westcountry and Central regions featured the same as above except for the Carlton logo below the ITV1 logo outside of a blue box.
 The former HTV West region featured the line "West of England" below the ITV1 logo.
 The former Carlton London and LWT regions had no regional idents. Both regions now had no on-screen identity – not even the name was retained. Before regional programming, a national ident was used with an announcer saying "You're watching ITV1 for London"

The set of idents were updated with new sets and celebrities on 1 September 2003, with the sets more pronounced blues and yellows and removing the backstage feel. Along with this, news ident graphics and the backgrounds to the regional idents were changed to overlapped blue squares.

A number of regions changed their identities throughout the period:

 The Anglia Television, Border Television, Granada Television, Meridian Broadcasting, Tyne Tees, Yorkshire Television and Channel Television regions all kept the national and regional idents, including the updated idents in 2003.
 The Central Independent Television, HTV West and Westcountry Television regions used the national idents, but dropped the regional idents three months after the updated look in 2003, replacing them with their own ones. They featured regional landscapes with three large blue cubes and a large yellow cube spread on the landscape. They featured the ITV1 logo in the bottom-right corner with a caption below stating "ITV1 for Central England", "ITV1 for the West of England" and "ITV1 for the Westcountry" respectively.
 The former HTV Wales region used their package, but adapted it three months after the rebrand in 2004 so that programming only shown to Wales used the landscape idents used by the Central, HTV West and Westcountry regions. Prior to national programming, the celebrities were used.
 The Grampian and Scottish Television regions kept the 2002 idents and did adopt the refreshed news idents and break bumpers in 2003.

The look was dropped at different times:

 The soon-to-be ITV plc, namely Anglia, Border, Carlton London, Central, HTV Wales, HTV West, Granada, LWT, Meridian, Tyne Tees and Westcountry and Yorkshire Television regions all dropped the look in 2004
 UTV dropped the look following the refresh in 2003, adopting their own regional pictures idents
 The Grampian and Scottish Television regions kept the 2002 Celebrity idents until 2006.
 Channel Television kept the look until 2004

November 2004 – January 2006

The 1 November 2004 heralded a new on-air look coinciding with the launch of ITV3. The ITV1 logo was reworked, splitting it into separate squares. On-screen, the boxes were arranged as a large yellow square containing the '1' with blue ITV boxes on top. This logo would be seen against a generic background of a blue sky with clouds, windows of a high-rise building, underwater with bubbles floating by, and dark blue ribbons flowing against a blue background.

The plan for these Idents was to use them as mini-menus showing what is coming up soon. The Idents would zoom to the left allowing a short video and description of the upcoming programmes to be shown before the panels of the videos become part of the ITV1 logo in the centre of the screen. They were not designed to be traditional idents, however, despite the fact that ITV took on a team of associate producers to produce these promotions, the promotional idents were used less and less as the months go on.

During this period, ITV spent a lot of this period using themed idents specific to particular programmes, such as Celebrity Love Island.

Once again, not all of the companies took the look:

 The ITV plc companies, namely Anglia, Border, Carlton, Central, Granada, HTV Wales, HTV West, LWT, Meridian, Tyne Tees, Westcountry and Yorkshire Television all adopted the look.
 The SMG plc companies, namely Grampian and Scottish refused to take the look, remaining with their 2002 national celebrity-themed idents until 2006.
 UTV completely boycotted the new look, instead opting for an in-house look of their own based on pictures of the region.
 Channel Television used the break bumpers, however instead used their hearts logo against filmed shots of the Channel Islands.

Regional idents were available and featured the ITV1 ident with the region name written under the logo, to a background of different shades of dark blue. However, the ident was becoming less frequently seen, usually only before some local news bulletins and the decreasing number of regional programming. ITV1 Wales was the exception to the rule, with a Wales name added to the bottom of all idents in their package.

The ITV plc regions, the only regions to adopt the look, dropped it in 2006 in favour of a complete overhaul. Final idents (ribbons and clouds) were shown on 16 January 2006 before GMTV, without spoken continuity announcements.

January – November 2006
On 16 January 2006, a brand new logo and presentation package was unleashed. It brought ITV1, ITV2, and ITV3 in line with ITV4. It was part of a major rebrand of the ITV network, known as Brand 2010, which also included the News and Sport divisions as well as off-screen content. It was designed by Red Bee Media following a perception analysis carried out by the audience. The results stated that although all the ITV channels had a good combining brand, with the ITV logo, they all looked the same, couldn't be told apart, their programming values were blurred and the ITV logo itself was getting boring.

The solution was to make a new logo in a rounded-off box, involving the lowercase itv. These, it was claimed, made the service look friendly, retaining what had been attempted in 1998, and yet fresh and crisp. From there they added an extra rectangle on the other side of the channel name. All channels shared this look with the colour being the only main difference with the exception of the name. This provided the distinctiveness, yet unity they sought.

The ITV1 idents were created on the basis that ITV1 provokes "an emotional response in all of us" and therefore the so-called 'Emotion' idents were created. Many were shot in South Africa and featured a montage of unrelated scenes, which include such things as a man rubbing his bare chest, girls rolling down a hill, and two people hugging trees. These represented moods such as joy, pride, sadness, love, etc. In them, the 'ITV1' logo would open out and enclose the footage it was superimposed onto. The exception to the rule was one of the ITV1 logo on a black background, used to introduce the news.

The look was controversial both with critics, online and in print, viewers and ITV bosses who saw the look as too vague. This look had one regional ident, Pride which was used before regional programming and also for a time at the 19:00 and 22:30 junctions on Thursdays, with an announcer name-checking the regional station on some occasions. These were the last ITV idents to include the region's name onscreen. ITV1 Wales also had a full selection of idents for a time before they began using the standard ITV1 idents with Wales added on the live television feed during transmission.

Only two of the four ITV parent companies adopted any part of the look:

 The ITV plc regions of Anglia, Border, Carlton, Central, Granada, HTV Wales, HTV West, LWT, Meridian, Tyne Tees, Westcountry and Yorkshire Television all adopted the full look. They dropped it in November.
 Channel Television adapted the look by using the logo and music, but replacing the emotional pictures themselves with images of the islands. They had by now dropped the 1999 comets logo, replacing it with the yellow ITV1 logo, with the name 'Channel Television' underneath the ITV1 logo.
 UTV refused to adopt the look, instead opting for their in-house created landscapes look.
 The SMG regions of Scottish Television and Grampian Television, both now branded as STV, refused to adopt the look vowing instead for their look involving Scottish people and a large elongated 'S', finally retiring the 2002 national Celebrity idents after four years.

November 2006 – January 2013

The next presentation of ITV1 was launched on 13 November 2006, just 10 months after the last new look. Following the issues with the previous one, the themes were changed slightly: the logo remained the same shape and style, but with the letters, ITV changed to black so as to contrast with the yellow of the logo better. This look also saw another change for regional idents for the ITV plc-owned stations; the regional names were now used leading into the regional news only.

The ident films themselves were scrapped and a new set was created following the theme of "Alive with Colour" with ITV promoting the new idents as the "second phase" of the look introduced in January. The idents, based on the previous set by Red Bee Media, were designed by The Mill and produced by Blink Productions and Pleix include surreal scenes featuring yellow colours to the same audio track. The look launched with six idents: 'Beach', 'Bike', 'Lake', 'Market', 'Basketball' and 'Pavement Art', with another 4 added on 3 September 2007 which runs in tandem with the previous ones. These latest idents included an ITV1 logo that was bigger than the ones launched in 2006 but retained the same soundtrack. 

In April 2010, ITV1 HD was launched, featuring an updated glossier logo based on that of ITV1. In response, ITV1 changed its logo to the glossier version and launched another four idents. These latest idents have been noticeably different from their predecessors: the logo was once again larger and faded on in parts. They also featured individual soundtracks based on those previously and the style of the ident themselves, namely the shooting of them, was very different from those before them. They were accompanied on-screen by updated programme promotions, end credit promotions, stings, and break bumpers.

Because of these changes, all of the idents were updated with the new logo, including making it bigger in many places. However, the soundtracks remained the same causing some to question why the other idents weren't changed with the new looks. Viewer opinions suggest that the original music is unpopular, but the ident package itself is generally popular. This has been the longest-lasting ITV generic look to date, lasting far longer than the 1999 Hearts, and being kept by far more companies and for longer collectively than the 1989 Generic look.

The primary criticisms of the look have been the scrapping of regional idents. All regions are introduced with a national ident and the region is not referenced in the announcement. The exception to the rule is ITV1 Wales, with includes the word 'Wales' either underneath the ident or located in the bottom left-hand corner of the ident. The Wales ident was used before all programming except overnight for the first few years of the rebrand before being quietly relegated to regional junctions only.

A paper lantern-themed ident, first aired in April 2010, was withdrawn after the National Farmers Union criticized ITV for the dangers of paper lanterns.

This package was only seen in some areas of the ITV network, however:

 All ITV plc companies of Anglia, Border, Carlton, Central, Granada, HTV Wales, HTV West, LWT, Meridian, Tyne Tees, Westcountry and Yorkshire Television adopted the look.
 UTV refused to adopt the look, instead opting for their in-house produced postcard idents of Northern Ireland landscapes.
 The STV Group companies of Scottish Television and Grampian Television refused the look, instead continuing their STV "S" idents until 2009 which was replaced by their triangle flip picture idents.
 Channel Television only used it on national programming and continues with the January 2006 look with their own landscape pictures before regional programming. However the new logo did appear on some network promotions on the station, due to their network link from ITV Meridian being 'unclean'. From 2011, all regional programmes were preceded with new idents featuring the new ITV1 logo of 2010 but soon killed it off.

The ITV plc regions, the only regions to adopt the look, dropped it in 2013 in favour of a complete overhaul.

January 2013 – December 2018 

On 15 November 2012, it was announced that ITV1 was to receive a rebrand in January 2013, in which it would revert to its old name of ITV. A new "curvy" logo was introduced with new idents and presentation package. This was first implemented on 14 January 2013.

Also on 13 January 2013, ITV1 +1 and ITV1 HD were rebranded to ITV +1 and ITV HD respectively, whilst sister channels ITV2, ITV3, ITV4, and CITV all received new idents and presentation based upon the new corporate logo (later two new channels based on the 2013 ITV logo, first ITV Encore from June 2014, and then ITVBe from October 2014 were also joined the sister channels).

ITV's new idents were created to reflect "everyday life of the Great British public". New idents will be brought in on a consistent basis to reflect the four seasons – Spring, Summer, Autumn, and Winter. In addition, the new ITV logo changes colour on each ident, a process named as "colour picking", in which each segment of the logo adopts the colour of whatever passes behind it.

This package is only seen on the ITV plc owned companies of Anglia, Border, Central, Channel Television, Granada, London, Meridian, Tyne Tees, Wales (Later ITV Cymru Wales), West Country and Yorkshire.

UTV fully used the look, when ITV plc bought the channel in February 2016 and relaunched it on 17 October 2016 to match ITV's 2013 branding.

The STV Group companies of STV Central and STV North have refused their new look, instead continuing with their triangle flip idents introduced on 23 March 2009, before being rebranded on 2 June 2014.

ITV Creates (January 2019 – November 2022) 

In December 2018, ITV announced a new project, ITV Creates, which would be the basis of its idents beginning on 1 January 2019. The network will commission artwork featuring the ITV logo from British artists, which will be used as the basis for a new set of idents every week. The first 8 artists of the project were Ravi Deepres, Sutapa Biswas, James Brunt, Patricia Volk, Mark Titchner, Katrina Russell Adams, Kristina Veasey, and James Alec Hardy.

ITV Creative executive creative director Tony Pipes explained that the project was meant to be a platform for British visual artists, reflect ITV's position as being an "endlessly creative" broadcaster, and counter the traditional notion of idents being a static theme used for a long-term period.

Until April 2020, the ITV Creates idents were only used by the ITV-branded stations in England, Wales, and the Channel Islands. UTV initially continued to use the 2013 ident series, with a new on-air presentation used alongside the new idents, but began taking on full ITV branding in April 2020. This was initially meant to be temporary due to the impact of the COVID-19 pandemic but was later made permanent in November of the same year. The STV Group of STV Central and STV North refused to adopt the new idents, instead continuing their 2014 series.

A new set of idents, entitled "ITV Creates Project", debuted on 1 January 2021. Unlike the original set, each ident was now used for a month rather than a week, with two batches. No ident was created for March 2021, due to ITV using their "ITV Kids Create" idents that month. In 2022, these idents were used in tandem with the original set of "Creates" idents.

Multiverse (November 2022–present)

On 15 November 2022, ahead of the introduction of the ITVX streaming service, ITV, ITV2, ITV3, ITV4, and ITVBe all underwent a rebranding by DixonBaxi with new logos and idents. ITV was additionally rebranded back to "ITV1" for the first time since 2013. The channels' new idents, by Coffee & TV, carry a theme of a "multiverse": each channel uses idents filmed at the same locations, but the background is then "swiped" to depict a scene occurring at that location that reflects each channel's programming output and image.

See also
 History of BBC television idents

References

External links
 itv.com
 ITV Creates (UK only to watch videos)

History of ITV
Television presentation in the United Kingdom